Presaddfed Burial Chamber is a listed monument in Anglesey, north Wales, comprising two Neolithic chamber tombs. It is a scheduled ancient monument and is located a short distance northwest of Bodedern. It is maintained by Cadw.

Tombs
Additionally there is a wooden frame beside the north upright that may provide some additional support. The northern tomb is considerably damaged with two remaining uprights at the north end; the capstone has fallen and is leaning against them. During the eighteenth century, when this site was first recorded, the northern tomb was already in a state of disrepair. It is unclear whether these chambers, which are only a few metres apart, were part of the same structure or were independent. A report in The Archaeological Journal in the mid-nineteenth century states that at that time the chambers were surrounded by a large number of small stones.

Investigation and protection
Presaddfed was described by Richard Gough in his 1798 version of William Camden's topographical survey Britannia. It was described in numerous nineteenth century articles in Archaeologia Cambrensis, and was included in J.E. Griffiths' 1900 book, 'A Portfolio of Photographs of the Cromlechs of Anglesey and Caernarvonshire'. Early reports suggest quantities of cairn material surrounded the cromlechs, which is no longer evident, so may have been removed in the nineteenth century. There appears not to have been any formal archaeological excavation on the monument. The monument now has legal protection as a Scheduled Monument, and is in the care of the state, managed by Cadw under a Guardianship agreement. The Royal Commission on the Ancient and Historical Monuments of Wales curates the archaeological, architectural and historic records for the site. These include digital photographs, colour and black and white photographs, drawings, NMR site files, and Cadw guardianship records.

It was excavated in 1870 and a jet bead and cremation urns were unearthed.

Media
The HeritageTogether project has used photogrammetry to create 3D models of the site.

Access
The site is open to the public, free of charge, throughout the year, save for 24, 25, 26 December and 1 January.

References

External links
 3D model of Presaddfed Burial Chamber

Scheduled monuments in Anglesey
Bodedern
Dolmens in Wales